Moonlighting: Live at the Ash Grove is a 1998 live album by Van Dyke Parks, containing reworkings of several of his previous compositions as well as many interpretations of other musicians work. Between songs, Parks talks to the audience for long periods, and even recites a poem by Robert Frost. The concert was held at the Ash Grove on the Santa Monica Pier and was headlined by Steve Young. The spoken dialogue between the songs was heavily edited. The concert was recorded as performed with the exception of "Hominy Grove", which required two takes. The first take of the song was marred by feedback (although inaudible to the audience). Van Dyke Parks announced from the stage that they would be re-recording the song due to feedback and the audience was welcome to stay or they could leave.

Track listing
All tracks composed by Van Dyke Parks; except where indicated
"Jump!" – 2:39
"Orange Crate Art" – 4:43
"Wings of a Dove" – 4:12
"Sail Away" – 6:11
"Night in the Tropics" (Louis Moreau Gottschalk, Van Dyke Parks) – 2:19
"FDR in Trinidad" (Arranged And adapted by Van Dyke Parks) – 4:33
"Danza" (Louis Moreau Gottschalk, Van Dyke Parks) – 3:44
"Cowboy" – 4:51
"Delta Queen Waltz" (John Hartford) – 4:07
"C-H-I-C-K-E-N" (Uncle Dave Macon)– 4:46
"The All Golden" – 1:41
"Hominy Grove" (Van Dyke Parks, Martin Fyodr Kibbee) – 3:06
"Sailin' Shoes" (Lowell Thomas George) – 3:55

References

vandykeparks.com - CD Moonlighting - Live at the Ash Grove

Van Dyke Parks albums
1998 live albums
Warner Records live albums